The Ramineni Foundation was founded in 1995 by the children of the late Ramineni Ayyanna Choudary in Cincinnati, Ohio, USA for the purpose of protecting and promoting the monumental heritage of Indian culture and the ideals of Hinduism. In addition, the primary mission of the foundation is to facilitate the valiant, relentless and altruistic efforts of all those high priests drawn from a cross-spectrum of fields in arts, science and humanities.


Dr. Ramineni Ayyanna Choudary

Ramineni Ayyanna Choudary, after whom the foundation and the awards were named, was born on 1929-10-12 in Brahmanakoduru, Guntur District, Andhra Pradesh, India to Veeriah Choudary and Kanya Kumari. He completed his school education in Guntur District and obtained a postgraduate degree in mathematics from Banaras Hindu University. Until 1955 he worked as a teacher in Palaparru and Movva. He left for the United States in 1955, and completed his master's degree in economics and finance followed by a doctorate from the University of Minnesota. During this time, he founded the Hindu Association of Minnesota to promote Hindu culture and civilisation and organised Hindu festivals & social activities regularly. He worked as a professor at Northland College in Ashland, Wisconsin, and Xavier University in Cincinnati, Ohio (1963–1973). He took early retirement from his job in order to devote his time to social and cultural activities. He established Downtown Property Management in Cincinnati.

He married Suguna in 1967 and gave birth to 6 children – Dharmapracharak, Saradha Devi, Satyavadhi, Brahmananda, Vedacharya and Harischandra.

He established Sangeeth Sahitya Samskrithi Hindu Dharma Nilayam and dedicated it to Indian fine arts. He developed agricultural activities and also established Hindustan Therapeutics at Hyderabad to supply high-quality, cost-effective veterinary medicines and feed supplements to farmers.

On the occasion of his 70th birthday, his children have started the Ramineni Foundation in India on 1999-10-12.

Choudary died on 2000-04-24 in Cincinnati.

Ramineni Foundation Awards

1999
Ramineni Foundation was inaugurated in India on 1999-10-12 at Hyderabad. The occasion was attended by C. Narayana Reddy as Chief Guest and Vempati China Satyam, N. Gopi, P. Siva Reddy and Gummadi as esteemed guests.

Visishta Puraskaram
 G. N. Rao – Director, L V Prasad Eye Institute

Viseesha Puraskaram
 Bapu 
 Ramana 
 Nanduri Rama Mohana Rao – Veteran journalist and Writer
 Kalipatnam Rama Rao – Custodian of Telugu Story, founder of Kathanilaya

2000
This function was attended by Akkineni Nageswara Rao as Chief Guest and D. N. Siva Prasad, Prof. Kakarla Subba Rao, M. Murali Mohan as esteemed Guests.

Visishta Puraskaram
 K. Varaprasad Reddy – MD Shantha Biotechnics

Viseesha Puraskaram
 Lalji Singh – Director, CCMB
 K. Viswanath – Cine Director
 Kaloji Narayana Rao – Veteran Writer

2001
The function was attended by U. Krishnam Raju, Union Minister of Defence as Chief Guest and Justice Jasti Chelameshwar, A. Gangadhara Rao, Former Chief Justice of High court of Andhra Pradesh, P V R K prasad IAS, and M. V. Bhasakara Rao as Esteemed Guests.

Visishta Puraskaram
 Chinchode Devender Reddi- Vice-Chancellor, Osmania University

Viseesha Puraskaram
 Volga – Popular Writer
 M. A. Subhan – Founder, Kalasaagar
 Nirmalamma – Veteran Artist

2002
The function was attended by K. Prathibha Bharathi, Speaker of Andhra Pradesh Legislative Assembly as Chief Guest and T Devendra Goud, Home Minister, Government of Andhra Pradesh, Kodela Siva Prasada Rao, Minister for Health, Government of Andhra pradesh, I. Venkata Rao, chairman, Press Academy of Andhra Pradesh, and Madugula Nagaphani Sharma as Esteemed Guests.

Visishta Puraskaram
 Shantha Sinha, Secretary -Trustee M. V. Foundation

Viseesha Puraskaram
Dr. Chukka Ramaiah (IIT)
 N. Koteswara Rao – Popular Writer
 Syed MD. Arif – National Chief Badminton Coach

2003
The function was attended by Mullapudi Harishchandra Prasad as Chief Guest and Somireddy Chandra mohan Reddy, Minister of Information & Public Relations, Government of Andhra Pradesh, Dr. Mohan Kanda, Chief Secretary of Government of Andhra Pradesh, Prevaram Ramulu, chairman, APPSC, and Rajasekhar, film actor as Esteemed Guests.

Visishta Puraskaram
 K. Anji Reddy – chairman, Reddy Labs

Viseesha Puraskaram
 C. Raghavachari
 Rao Balasaraswathi Devi – Popular Singer
 C. V. Krishna Rao – Social Worker and Writer

2004
The function was attended by Avadhoota Datta Peethadhipathi Sri Ganapathi satchtananda Swamiji and Nara Chandra Babu Naidu, Former Chief Minister of Andhra Pradesh as Chief Guests and V S Rama Devi, Former Governor of Karnataka, Pathuri Nagabhushanam, Chairman Zilla Parishad, Guntur as Esteemed Guests.

Visishta Puraskaram
 Yarlagadda Nayudamma, Pediatric Surgeon, Guntur

Viseesha Puraskaram
 Tadepalli Lakshmi Kanta Rao – Veteran Artist
 Buddiga Subbarayan – Popular Writer
 Hemalatha Lavanam – Secretary – SAMSKAR

2005
The function was attended by Tridandi China Jeeyar Swamiji and Dasari Narayana Rao, Union Minister for Coal & Mines, Government of India, as Chief Guests and K. R. Suresh Reddy, Speaker Of Andhra Pradesh State Legislative Assembly, and A. K. Khan, Additional Commissioner of Police as Esteemed Guests.

Visishta Puraskaram
D.Nageswar Reddy – Gastroenterologist, Director, Asian Institute of Gastroenterlogy

Viseesha Puraskaram
 Boyi Bhimanna – Veteran Writer
 K. Sugunamani – Andhra Mahila Sabha 
 Navodaya Rama Mohana Rao – Navodaya Publishers, Vijayawada

2006
The function was attended by Konijeti Rossaiah, Minister for Finance, Medical and Health, Government Of Andhra Pradesh, Avula Manjulatha Vice Chancellor of Potti Sriramulu Telugu University, and C. C. Reddy, Adviser, Government of Andhra Pradesh, as Esteemed Guests, Jury Members, B. V. Pattabhiram, G. N. Rao, Paruchuri Gopala Krishna, A V S.

Visishta Puraskaram
Padam Bhushan K. Srinath Reddy, Professor and Head of the Dept of Cardiology, AIIMS

Viseesha Puraskaram
 Umar Alisha – Philanthropist, Chairman Umar Alisha Rural Development Trust, Pithapuram
  I. V. Chalapathi Rao, Eminent Academician
 Smt Anjali Devi – Veteran Artist

2007
The function was attended by Narayan Dutt Tiwari, Governor of Andhra Pradesh, as Chief Guest and N. Rajyalakshmi, Minister For Women Development, Government of Andhra Pradesh, G. Aruna Kumari, Minister for Medical Education, Government Of Andhra Pradesh and M. Venkataramana Rao, Minister for Infrastructure, Investment, Government Of Andhra Pradesh and jury members G.N. Rao, director, L.V. Prasad Eye Institute, K. Ramachandramurthy, Editor, Andhra Jyothi, and magician B.V. Pattabhiram have participated at the occasion.

Visishta Puraskaram
 P. Ramachandra Rao, Director of Defence Institute of Advanced Technology

Viseesha Puraskaram
 Nerella Venu Madhav – Cine Artist
 P. Susheela – Playback singer
 Reddi Raghavaiah – author of children's literature

2018

Viseesha Puraskaram
 Dr.Garikapati Narasimha Rao (literary performer)
 Nag Ashwin(Art - Cinema - Best Director)

References

External links 
  
 

Awards established in 1995
Civil awards and decorations of India
Indian awards